Love Exchange is an Indian 2015 Bollywood romantic comedy film directed by Raj V Shetty and produced by Nadia Ali Shirazi under the Winds of Change Entertainment banner. The film was released on 30 October 2015.

Cast
Mohit Madaan
Jyoti Sharma
Manoj Pahwa
Darshan Jariwala
Neelu Kohli
Shama Deshpande
Raju Kher
Suchint Singh
Sharat Sonu
Adhvik Mahajan

Plot
Love Exchange beautifully blends two diverse cultures in an entertaining, lively and convincing manner while capturing the essence of romance at the same time.

Soundtrack

The tracks of Love Exchange were composed by Jaidev Kumar and penned by Kumaar. The music rights were acquired by Zee Music Company.

References

External links
 

2010s Hindi-language films
2015 films
2015 romantic comedy films
Indian romantic comedy films
Films scored by Jaidev Kumar
Films shot in Mumbai